Dualeh is a Somali language surname. People with the name include:

Ahmed Farah Dualeh  Somali-Danish community worker and politician
Hussein Abdi Dualeh  Somali politician and petroleum engineer
Raqiya Haji Dualeh Abdalla  Somali sociologist and

Somali-language surnames